Dorotea Mather Turnbull (20 May 1929 – 11 January 2016) was an Argentine breaststroke swimmer who competed at the 1948 Summer Olympics.

References

Swimmers at the 1948 Summer Olympics
Olympic swimmers of Argentina
Argentine people of British descent
Argentine female breaststroke swimmers
Pan American Games silver medalists for Argentina
Pan American Games medalists in swimming
Swimmers at the 1951 Pan American Games
1929 births
2016 deaths
Medalists at the 1951 Pan American Games